One of the competitions in equestrian at the 1924 Summer Olympics was the team eventing. The rules only allowed military officers to join the competition. From the results of the individual eventing, a team event was compiled.

Team event
The results of the first three officers were combined. The Dutch team, consisting of Adolph van der Voort van Zijp, Charles Pahud de Mortanges, Gerard de Kruijff and Antonius Colenbrander (whose results did not count) won that competition.

Results

The scores of riders in italics (the fourth-best rider on each team as well as non-finishers) were not counted.

References

Sources
 

Eventing team